Canadaway Creek is a stream in Chautauqua County, New York which empties into Lake Erie in Dunkirk, New York.

Non-natives settled on the creek first in 1804, in what was first called "Canadaway" and became Fredonia, New York.

References

Rivers of Chautauqua County, New York
Tributaries of Lake Erie